Samuel H. "Harry" Hess was an American football and baseball coach.  He served as the second head football at Fairmount College—now known as Wichita State University—in Wichita, Kansas and he held that position for three seasons, from 1899 until 1901, compiling a record of 10–10–2.  Hess was also the head baseball coach at Fairmount from 1899 to 1901.

Hess was a pharmacist in Wichita and had played football at the University of Kansas.

Head coaching record

Football

References

Year of birth missing
Year of death missing
19th-century players of American football
American pharmacists
Kansas Jayhawks football players
Wichita State Shockers baseball coaches
Wichita State Shockers football coaches